Winagami Lake is a large and shallow lake in northern Alberta, Canada. It is located in Big Lakes County and Municipal District of Smoky River No. 130, northeast of the junction of Highway 2 and Highway 679. It lies in the hydrographic basin of the Athabasca River.

The name comes from a Cree phrase meaning "dirty-water lake": .

The lake contains lake whitefish, yellow perch, northern pike and walleye.

Winagami Lake Provincial Park is located on the western, southern and eastern shores of the lake.

See also
Lakes of Alberta

References

Big Lakes County
Lakes of Alberta
Municipal District of Smoky River No. 130